Qeshlaq-e Qarah Tappeh or Qeshlaq-e Qareh Tappeh may refer to:
Qeshlaq-e Qarah Tappeh Maleklar, Ardabil Province
Qeshlaq-e Qarah Tappeh Tamaq Ali, Ardabil Province
Qeshlaq-e Qarah Tappeh, East Azerbaijan